Sefid Kamar or Safid Kamar may refer to:
 Sefid Kamar, East Azerbaijan
 Sefid Kamar, Kurdistan
 Sefid Kamar, Zanjan